Carlos Alzugarai was one of the pioneers of Cuban Scouting. In 1914, the first Scout groups in Cuba were founded, and Carlos Alzugarai, Miguel Ángel Quevedo, Jules Loustalot and others wrote up the statutes and began Scout activities.

References

External links 
 
 

Scouting pioneers
Scouting and Guiding in Cuba
Year of birth missing